Krška Vas is a settlement just east of Krka, near the source of the Krka River, in the Municipality of Ivančna Gorica in central Slovenia. The area is part of the historical region of Lower Carniola. The municipality is now included in the Central Slovenia Statistical Region. 

A small roadside chapel-shrine in the settlement is dedicated to Saint Joseph and was built in the last quarter of the 19th century.

References

External links

Krška Vas on Geopedia

Populated places in the Municipality of Ivančna Gorica